Alfred Campanelli (July 9, 1925 – April 9, 2003) was an American suburban housing mogul who was responsible for much of the early suburban-style housing in Schaumburg, a suburb of Chicago, Illinois, USA.  In 1959, Alfred Campanelli began construction of the first large residential subdivision in Schaumburg, known as Weathersfield, which is located near Springinsguth and Schaumburg Roads. The subdivision now contains several thousand single-family homes built in 22 stages over two decades. In all, Campanelli constructed over 6,800 housing units or approximately 20% of the Village's housing stock.  Richard "Dickie" Lasardo oversaw construction of Campanelli's homes as Campanelli's top foreman. Beginning in 2000, teardowns have begun to occur in the original "W" section of Weathersfield, named such because all of the streets in this section begin with a "W".

Born July 9, 1925, the son of Franscesco and Lisa Campanelli, Alfred died on April 9, 2003, of natural causes due to complications of a stroke years prior, at his Fort Lauderdale, Florida home. Francis Campanelli was an Italian cobbler and emigrated to the United States in the early 1900s and settled in Brockton, Massachusetts. The senior Campanelli, who died in 1927, was the father of three other Campanelli sons who joined Alfred to begin the construction company that built most of Schaumburg's original homes.

Campanelli School was named in memory of Francis Campanelli. Opening in the fall of 1961, Campanelli School was the first of numerous land sites donated to District 54 by the construction company expressly for the purpose of building schools.  Campanelli School, however, was the only building paid for and donated by Campanelli Bros. to the district.

Alfred Campanelli was a strong philanthropist, and gave much back to the community. The local YMCA was renamed the Alfred Campanelli YMCA after him.

References

http://campanelli.sd54.org

American construction businesspeople
1925 births
2003 deaths
People from Brockton, Massachusetts